101 Dalmatians II: Patch's London Adventure is a 2003 American animated direct-to-video adventure comedy film produced by Walt Disney Television Animation and Walt Disney Animation Japan, and the sequel to the 1961 Disney animated film One Hundred and One Dalmatians. It was written and directed by Jim Kammerud and Brian Smith, and released by Walt Disney Home Entertainment on January 21, 2003. It features the voices of Bobby Lockwood, Barry Bostwick, Martin Short, Jason Alexander, Susanne Blakeslee, Kath Soucie, Jeff Bennett, and Jim Cummings. It garnered DVDX awards for best animated feature, best director, best editing, and best musical score. Disney re-released the film on September 16, 2008.

Plot 

The Radcliffe family and their 101 Dalmatians are preparing to move to their "Dalmatian Plantation", a home in the countryside with plenty of room for all of them. However, Patch, one of the puppies, feels ignored and wishes to be unique like his television hero, Thunderbolt. While watching The Thunderbolt Adventure Hour, Patch hears about a chance to appear on the show. He is accidentally left behind when his family leaves for the plantation, so he decides to head for the audition to meet his hero and win a guest spot on the show, but fails to impress the producers.

Meanwhile, Thunderbolt's "trusty" sidekick, Lil' Lightning, tells Thunderbolt the producers want to replace him with a younger dog. In order to save his job, Thunderbolt decides he will go into the real world and perform an act of true heroism to prove himself. A veritable reference book to Thunderbolt's many adventures, Patch provides the perfect guide for the television star in his attempts at real-life heroics. Elsewhere in London, Cruella de Vil attempts to soothe her fixation on spots with the help of Lars, a French beatnik artist. In order to inspire him, she restarts her hunt for the Dalmatians, using a newspaper picture of Patch to find their new address.

Patch's family finally becomes aware that he is missing and go back to London to find him. Cruella bails her former henchmen, Jasper and Horace, out of prison. She sends them in a stolen dog food truck to steal the remaining puppies. They succeed after dealing with Nanny, and they take them to Lars. When Cruella requests she be made a masterpiece from their fur, Lars angrily refuses, not wanting them to be harmed. Angered, she has him bound and gagged and returns to her original plan of making a Dalmatian fur coat.

The imprisoned puppies use the Twilight Bark to send a distress signal, which is picked up by Patch and Thunderbolt, and they set out to save Patch's family. Lightning is horrified when he discovers Thunderbolt might actually become a hero and hurries to the warehouse where the puppies are being held. He convinces Thunderbolt not to use Patch's stealth plan, but to openly attack. Cruella appears, knocks Thunderbolt out, and locks Patch and Thunderbolt in a cage. Lightning sneaks in and reveals to Patch that Thunderbolt is just an actor. Patch is deeply hurt that Thunderbolt would lie, but soon realizes that their current situation was covered in one of The Thunderbolt Adventure Hour episodes, and manages to escape. Patch releases his family, but Thunderbolt stays in his open cage. Patch manages to trick Cruella, Jasper, and Horace into going downstairs, while the puppies escape through the building's roof. Meanwhile, Thunderbolt escapes from his cage and frees Lars.

The puppies board a double-decker bus, but Cruella, Jasper, and Horace discover the escape and pursue them in their stolen truck, racing through the streets of London, and crashing through the filming of Lightning's new show. Cruella, Jasper and Horace finally corner the puppies in an alley. Patch tries to hold them off while the others escape, but they are undaunted. Luckily, Thunderbolt arrives, having been driven to the scene by Lars, and fakes a heart attack, distracting Cruella and  causing her to knock out Jasper and Horace and incapacitate herself. Patch puts the bus into reverse, sending Cruella, Jasper, Horace, and Lil' Lightning scrambling into the River Thames, along with their stolen truck. Patch and Thunderbolt survey the scene, both letting out deep, heroic barks. The police arrest Lightning, Jasper, and Horace, while Cruella, now driven completely insane, is sent to a mental institution. Pongo, Perdita, The Radcliffes, and Nanny arrive, and Patch's parents tell him they are proud of him. Thunderbolt dismisses himself as just an actor, but says that Patch is "a real, one of a kind wonder-dog".

Voice cast 
 Bobby Lockwood as Patch, one of the 101 Dalmatian puppies. He has a large black spot over one of his eyes, hence his name. He feels lonely and left-out oftentimes with his family, thinking that he is just one of the famous 101 Dalmatians, and longs for a chance to become separate and leave the shadow of his brothers and sisters. He is adventurous, bold, and strong-minded. He quickly befriends Thunderbolt, the famous television wonder-dog whom he adores, and later meets Lil' Lightning, the famous sidekick of Thunderbolt (only to be betrayed by him later on).
 Barry Bostwick as Thunderbolt, a German Shepherd and the star of The Thunderbolt Adventure Hour. As the film opens, it is shown that Thunderbolt is not exactly bright, and very self-centered and rude to his sidekick, Lil' Lightning, which eventually provokes the Corgi to revolt. When Thunderbolt runs away, after being tricked by Lightning in thinking that the director of his famous show plans to kill him off, he runs into Patch, and the two quickly bond, trying to do heroic feats to prove that Thunderbolt is a real hero. As the film progresses, Thunderbolt becomes a fatherlike figure to Patch, and loses his starry-eyed, naive ways to become a strong, brave, and faithful dog.
 Susanne Blakeslee as Cruella de Vil, the villain of the original film, back again to kidnap the puppies. She is now under a restraining order due to her past history of crimes of trying to kidnap and kill the Dalmatian puppies. To help cure her obsession for fur, she meets Lars and has him do a Dalmatian masterpiece for her, but he refuses once she reveals she wants him to use the puppies' coats as canvases. This makes her revolt and go back to her original plan of kidnapping the dogs for a coat. In the end, she is defeated and sent to a psychiatric hospital.
 Jason Alexander as Lil' Lightning, a Pembroke Welsh Corgi and the sidekick of Thunderbolt's famous show. Initially, Thunderbolt considers Lightning his best friend, despite being rude to him and pushing him aside. Eventually, Lightning becomes angry at always crawling in Thunderbolt's shadow and putting up with his arrogance and rejection of him. To retaliate, Lightning tricks Thunderbolt into running away, then plots to manipulate the director into re-writing the show slanted towards Lightning. When Thunderbolt and Patch return, endangering Lightning's chance at fame, he reveals himself to be the traitor he is and has the two dogs locked away. In the end, however, he briefly shows remorse when Thunderbolt fakes his death, but is then taken away to the dog pound by two police dogs.
 Martin Short as Lars, a stylish, but eccentric, French artist who enjoys little more than painting spots. It is suggested he had some romantic feelings towards Cruella, but when she captures the Dalmatian puppies again and plans to break her rules of goodness and make coats out of them, he realizes her true colors and rebels, only to be bound and gagged by Cruella herself. In the end, he is freed by Thunderbolt and sends him to defend Patch from Cruella, Jasper, and Horace.
 Samuel West as Pongo, father of the 15 Dalmatian puppies (and adopted father of the other 84). He is loving but distracted, something here that forces Patch to feel lonely and just one-hundred and one, instead of standing out. In the workprint, Kevin Schon reprises his role as Pongo from the series.
 Kath Soucie as Perdita, mother of the 15 Dalmatian puppies (and adopted mother of the other 84). She is a gentle, loving soul who only wants the best for her children (and adopted children), and is horrified to find her children missing once again. In the workprint, Pam Dawber reprises her role as Perdita from the series.
 Tim Bentinck as Roger Radcliffe, Pongo's original owner and a aspiring songwriter. In the workprint, Jeff Bennett reprises his role as Roger from the series.
 Jodi Benson as Anita Radcliffe, Roger's wife and Perdita's original owner.
 Jeff Bennett and Maurice LaMarche as Jasper and Horace Baddun, Cruella's bumbling henchmen. They are in jail when the film starts, but are bailed out by Cruella, who rehires them to finish the job of killing and skinning the Dalmatian puppies, though they doubt her as they do not want to be made fools of again. She later has them capture the puppies in cages and bring them to Lars so he can use them as canvases for a masterpiece. In the end, Jasper and Horace are arrested again. Surprisingly, however, they part ways with Cruella after this second arrest, opening a shop in London instead of continuing their past occupation as incompetent criminals.
 Mary MacLeod as Nanny, the Radcliffe family's maid, who confronts the Baduns (again) when they attempt to steal the puppies a second time.
 Ben Tibber as Lucky, one of Patch's brothers.
 Eli Russel Linnetz as Rolly, one of Patch's brothers, a chubby food lover.
 Kasha Kropinski as Penny, one of Patch's sisters.
 Michael Lerner as Producer
 Jim Cummings as Dirty Dawson, the villain of The Thunderbolt Adventure Hour.
 Cummings also voices the Colonel, an Old English Sheepdog and a friend of the Dalmatian family. He is cut from the final cut of the movie, but is seen in the workprint, where he moves into the Dalmatian Plantation and assists in the film's final battle.
 Michael Gough as Sergeant Tibbs, a farm cat and a friend to the Dalmatian family. He is cut from the final cut of the movie, but is seen in the workprint, where he moves into the Dalmatian Plantation and assists in the film's final battle.
 Frank Welker as the Captain, a horse and a friend to the Dalmatian family. He is cut from the final cut of the movie, but is seen in the workprint, where he moves into the Dalmatian Plantation and assists in the film's final battle.
 Welker also provides Additional Animals' Vocal Effects and Additional Voices.

Release 
101 Dalmatians II: Patch's London Adventure was released direct-to-video on January 21, 2003. Bonus features on the DVD include the behind-the-scenes footage "Making of Dog-umentary", music videos "Try Again" by Will Young and "You're the One" by LMNT, and some games. The film was re-released on DVD on September 16, 2008. It was released on Blu-ray on September 3, 2012 in the United Kingdom, along with the UK Blu-ray release of the original film. Finally, the film was released on Blu-ray on June 9, 2015 in the United States, following the first HD Blu-ray release of its predecessor.

Critical reception 
In contrast to most Disney direct-to-video sequels, the film received positive reviews from critics. Rotten Tomatoes rating for it is currently 67% "Fresh" based on 6 reviews and has an average rating of 5/10, but without a consensus.

Soundtrack

Video game 
A video game based on the film was released exclusively on PlayStation on November 20, 2003.

References

External links 

 
 
 
 

2003 animated films
2003 direct-to-video films
2000s adventure films
2000s American animated films
2003 comedy-drama films
2000s musical films
Patch's London Adventure
American adventure comedy films
American children's animated adventure films
American children's animated comedy films
American children's animated drama films
American children's animated musical films
American sequel films
Animated films about dogs
Animated films based on children's books
Children's comedy-drama films
Direct-to-video sequel films
Disney direct-to-video animated films
DisneyToon Studios animated films
2000s English-language films
Animated films based on British novels
Films set in 1962
American direct-to-video films
Animated films set in London
Disney Television Animation films
Films directed by Jim Kammerud
Films scored by Richard Gibbs
Films with screenplays by Jim Kammerud
2000s children's animated films